The Society of Washington Artists was established in 1890 in Washington, D.C. The Society was organized by the Art Students League of Washington.

The Society's first exhibit was in 1891, held at the Woodward & Lothrop building. Within a few years the Society had its own gallery space at 1020 Connecticut Avenue. In that space the Society exhibited loaned art work held in private collections in Washington, D.C. By 1900 the Society's annual exhibits included out-of-town artists and were the forerunners of the Corcoran Gallery's Biennial Exhibition of Contemporary American Art.

Early exhibitors included Alice Pike Barney, Frank Weston Benson, William Merritt Chase, L. Birge Harrison, Childe Hassam, Hobart Nichols, Edward Willis Redfield, George Senseney, Juliet Thompson, and Irving Ramsey Wiles.

The Society has a collection of art. The majority of the collection was donated in 2015 from the trustees of Corcoran Gallery of Art.

References 

American artist groups and collectives
1890 establishments in Washington, D.C.
Arts organizations established in 1890
Arts organizations based in Washington, D.C.